John F. Kennedy Street ( / Ulica Džona Kenedija) is located in New Belgrade, Serbia. It extends from the Nikola Tesla Boulevard} to Tošin Bunar Street, and its length is 1,453 meters. It is named after U.S. President John F. Kennedy (1917-1963).

See also
 List of memorials to John F. Kennedy

New Belgrade
Streets in Belgrade